Il Giustino RV 717 is a 1724 opera by Vivaldi set to a libretto by Nicolò Beregan, also set by Albinoni and Handel. The opera was composed for the 1724 carnival season in Rome and premiered at the Teatro Capranica.

The aria of Anastasio, Vedrò con mio diletto, has become a famous piece sung at concerts and on recordings by countertenors such as Philippe Jaroussky and Jakub Józef Orliński and by contraltos as Sonia Prina. Sinfonia of Act I, Scene V, is also used by Vivaldi as the main motif of the first movement of La Primavera ("Spring") from his concerti The Four Seasons.

The opera was revived in modern times in 1985 in a production directed by Alan Curtis and performed at the Teatro Olimpico in Vicenza, at the Opéra Royal of the Palace of Versailles, and at the Teatro La Fenice in Venice. According to data reported by Le magazine de l'opéra baroque, a subsequent performance in concert form was held at the Mégaron Musikis in Athens in 2007, while a further revival on stage, for a total of twelve performances, took place, between 2008 and 2009, at the Oldenburgisches Staatstheater.

In July 2018, a concert performance was given at the Festival International d'Opéra Baroque de Beaune — with the Accademia Bizantina conducted by Ottavio Dantone. In August 2018, a full costume version of Il Giustino, directed by Deda Cristina Colonna and conducted by Peter Spissky and the Camerata Øresund, figured as one of the central pieces in the Næstved Early Music Festival.

Recording
 Vivaldi - Il Giustino. Dominique Labelle, Marina Comparato, Francesca Provvisionato, Geraldine McGreevy. Leonardo De Lisi,  Laura Cherici. Il Complesso Barocco dir. Alan Curtis Virgin Classics 2002
 Vivaldi - Il Giustino. Delphine Galou, Emőke Baráth, Verónica Cangemi, Emiliano Gonzales Toro, Arianna Vendittelli, Accademia Bizantina, Ottavio Dantone  Naive 2018

See also
List of operas by Antonio Vivaldi

References

Operas by Antonio Vivaldi
Operas
1724 operas
Italian-language operas